Pantham Gandhi Mohan was a politician and member of the Indian National Congress. Mohan was a member of the Andhra Pradesh Legislative Assembly from the Peddapuram (Vidhan Sabha constituency) in East Godavari district through Chiranjeevi's Prajarayam Party. He served as a member of legislative assembly from 2009–2014. He has recently joined in Y.S.Jagan's YSRCP.

References 

People from East Godavari district
Indian National Congress politicians from Andhra Pradesh
Praja Rajyam Party politicians
Members of the Andhra Pradesh Legislative Assembly
Living people
Andhra Pradesh politicians
21st-century Indian politicians
Year of birth missing (living people)
Jana Sena Party politicians